Alexander Pearson may refer to:

 Alex Pearson (1877–1966), Major League Baseball pitcher
 Alexander Pearson, Jr. (1895–1924), aviation figure in the Army Air Service 
 Alexander William Pearson (born 1854), rugby union international who represented England